The FIL World Luge Championships 2007 took place February 2-4, 2007 at the bobsleigh, luge, and skeleton track in Igls, Austria for the fourth time after having hosted the event in 1977, 1987, and 1997.

Men's singles

Women's singles

Hüfner followed her Winter Olympic bronze medal at Turin with a gold at this championship event.

Men's doubles

Grimette and Martin of the United States won their third straight bronze medal in this event at the World Championships while Leitner and Resch won their sixth overall medal in this event in the championships, including their fourth gold. Scheigl and Schiegl also won their sixth overall medal in this event.

Mixed team

Medal table

References
Men's doubles World Champions
Men's singles World Champions
Mixed teams World Champions
Women's singles World Champions

FIL World Luge Championships
2007 in luge
2007 in Austrian sport
Luge in Austria